Seán Cummins (born 1985) is an Irish hurler who played as a substitute right corner-back for the Kilkenny senior team.

Cummins joined the team during the 2006, however, he remained on the fringes of the team for a number of years before making his debut in 2009. As a player, he has won one All-Ireland winners' medal at intermediate level and a National League winners' medal. He has also won four All-Ireland medals at senior level as a non-playing substitute.

At club level Cummins plays hurling with Rower–Inistioge.

References

1985 births
Living people
Rower-Inistioge hurlers
UCD hurlers
Kilkenny inter-county hurlers